Contact Energy Limited is a New Zealand electricity generator, a wholesaler of natural gas, and a retailer of electricity, natural gas, broadband and LPG.

It is the second-largest electricity generator in New Zealand (after Meridian Energy), generating 23% of all electricity in 2014, and has the second-largest market share (22%) of electricity retailers (after Genesis Energy). Contact owns and operates five geothermal power stations near Taupo, natural-gas turbine facilities at Hamilton and at Stratford in Taranaki, two hydroelectric dams on the Clutha River, and a diesel fuelled station near Napier.

Contact originated with the partitioning of the Electricity Corporation of New Zealand in 1996, and publicly listed in 1999.

History 
Contact Energy was incorporated on 8 November 1995 and became a state-owned enterprise on 18 November 1995. It commenced operations on 1 February 1996, acquiring assets from ECNZ with a payment of $1.6 billion. The founding chief executive Paul Anthony was instrumental in establishing the corporation distinct from ECNZ.

In 1999, the company was sold, with 40% purchased by Edison Mission Energy (EME) as cornerstone shareholder for $5 per share.  The remaining 60% was sold in a public offering of shares for $3.10 per share. Edison Mission Energy subsequently increased its shareholding to 51%.

As part of the 1999 electricity sector reforms, local electricity companies were split into lines and retail, with most selling the retail part. Contact Energy acquired the retail bases of Top Energy, Counties Power, Eastland Network (Gisborne area), Unison (Hawke's Bay area), Electra, Network Tasman, MainPower, Alpine Energy, Aurora Energy (Dunedin area), the Power Company and Electricity Invercargill.

Edison Mission Energy sold its shareholding to Origin Energy in 2004, following financial difficulties elsewhere in its business.

During the global financial crisis of 2007–2008, Contact Energy raised its prices by up to 12% while doubling its directors' fees. As a result, it lost more than 40,000 customers (10% of the total) in six months and its profit halved. Contact said this was the worst blow to its reputation in the company's history.

Origin Energy sold its 53% shareholding to the market in 2015, following financial difficulties elsewhere in its business.

Power stations 
Contact owns and operates (unless otherwise stated) the following power stations:

Decommissioned stations
In 2001, Contact decommissioned the FT4 twinpac open cycle power stations on the Stratford and Whirinaki sites, and sold the generating equipment offshore. In June 2013, the previously decommissioned New Plymouth Power Station was sold to Port Taranaki and Methanex New Zealand. In 2016, Contact sold the Otahuhu Power Station. This was the site of Otahuhu A power station (diesel fueled open cycle gas turbines, commissioned in 1968) and Otahuhu B power station (380MW gas fueled combined cycle plant, commissioned in 2000).

Developments

Generation developments

Other developments
In 2001 and 2002, Contact and Edison Mission Energy developed the Valley Power Peaking Facility near Traralgon in Australia. It was sold in 2005.

In 2006, Contact and Genesis Energy set up the Gasbridge joint venture project to import LNG. Their proposed terminal at Port Taranaki was highly controversial, and the plan was shelved in favour of an offshore terminal plan in mid-2009.

Contact and Origin Energy developed a gas storage facility at the depleted Ahuroa reservoir in Taranaki.

In 2012, Contact decided not to proceed with hydro developments on the Clutha River, at Queensbury, Luggate, Tuapeka and Beaumont. Development of hydro generation on Lake Hawea was due to be completed in 2017.

In June 2013, the Taheke joint venture (Taheke 8C Incorporated and Contact Energy) decided to delay the development of the Taheke Geothermal field due to market conditions.

In August 2013, Contact decided to exit the Hauāurumā raki wind generation development on the Waikato coast. In 2016, Contact allowed its consent for the Waitahora Wind Farm near Dannevirke in the Tararua district to lapse, meaning the farm would not be built.

In 2017 Contact started selling broadband Internet access, via both fibre-optic and copper lines, bundled with other services. In 2020 Contact started using network services company Devoli as provider of the broadband service that Contact resells.

In 2021, Contact decided to proceed with development of the $580m Tauhara geothermal project.

See also 
Electricity sector in New Zealand
New Zealand electricity market

References

External links 
 

Electric power companies of New Zealand
New Zealand companies established in 1996
Companies based in Wellington